The PFAM Player of the Month (Malaysia Premier League) is an association football award that recognises the best Malaysian League player that played in the Malaysia Premier League each month of the season.

The player nominated in the month will be selected by a panel comprising representatives from PFAM, asiana.my, 139associates and media practitioners.

"We received a proposal from the PFAM members itself and also the fans who ask for the award to be extended to the premier league," PFAM Chief Executive Officer, Izham Ismail said after launching the Award for the Premier League Player of the Month in 2016 at Subang.

Assessment will be made by the Nomination Committee PFAM Player of the Month Award - asiana.my comprising practitioners who are experienced in sports media. Among the matters considered by the Nomination Committee is the player's performance during the month, the goals scored and assists made. They are free to choose any player from the Premier League who they felt deserved to receive the award. Votes will be made through the website which is the PFAM official website. The voters can vote via desktop, laptop, smartphone, or tablet and can use all types of browsers. Anyone can vote for the candidates that have been chosen for the award. PFAM will include a list of nominations on the site for each month.

Organised by Professional Footballers Association of Malaysia, the Player of the Month award was introduced in July 2016, Ilija Spasojevic is the first winner for this award. The most recent winner is Negeri Sembilan FA player, Mohd Nasriq Baharom for April 2017.

Prize
For 2016, the winner will received a trophy contributed by All Sport Images and News Agency (asiana.my) and RM500 by 139associates.

Winners

Candidates

Voting Percentage

Multiple winners
The below table lists those who have won on more than one occasion.

Awards won by position

Awards won by nationality

Awards won by club

References

External links
 PFAM-PLAYER OF THE MONTH PREMIER LEAGUE

Association football trophies and awards
Football in Malaysia